Muhammad Asif Bajwa  is a Pakistani politician who was a Member of the Provincial Assembly of the Punjab, from May 2013 to May 2018.

Early life and education
He was born on 1 January 1964 in Sialkot.

He has the degree of Bachelor of Arts and the degree of Bachelor of Laws. He has the degree of Doctor of Philosophy in Law which he received in 2016 and has the degree of Master of Philosophy in Law which he obtained in 2012. He also received the degree of Master of Laws in 2007 from University of Karachi.

Political career

He was elected to the Provincial Assembly of the Punjab as a candidate of Pakistan Muslim League (Nawaz) from Constituency PP-130 (Sialkot-X) in 2013 Pakistani general election.

Personal career and interests

Mr Muhammad Asif Bajwa, Advocate son of Mr Muhammad Saeed was born on January 1, 1964, in Sialkot. He did his PhD (Law) in 2016 and obtained the degree of M.Phil (Law) in 2012 and Master of Laws (LL.M) in 2007 from the University of Karachi, Karachi. An advocate, an agriculturist and a businessman, who has been elected as Member, Provincial Assembly of Punjab in general elections 2013. He has served as General Secretary, Bar Association Daska during 2003-04 and as President during 2011-12. To his credit, he has publication cum-LLM thesis titled “Qanoon-e-Shahadat and False Evidence” published in 2007. He has visited Saudi Arabia, France, Italy, Belgium, Spain, the UK, Germany and the UAE.

References

Positions held in external bodies

ORGANIZATION	POST	TENURE

1 - Daska Bar Association	                            -  General Secretary    -      2003-2004
2 - Daska Bar Association	                            -  President            -	   2011-2012
3 - Civil Club Daska	                                    - General Secretary     -	   2003-04, 2005–06
4 - Civil Club, Daska	                                    - Vice President	    -      2006-07
5 - Daska Engineering & Industrial Association	President	                    -      2012-13
6 - Daska Engineering & Industrial Association	President	                    -      2013-14

Permanent contact

House No.196, Model Town Daska, District Sialkot
052-6611535 (Work), 0300-8746535 (Mobile)

Visits to other countries

COUNTRY	                     PURPOSE OF VISIT	                             YEAR
Belgium	                     To attend Lawyer's Conference	             2008
France	                     To attend Lawyer's Conference	             2010
Germany        	             To attend Lawyer's Conference	             2007
Italy	                     To attend Lawyer's Conference	             2010
Saudi Arabia	             Hajj, Umrah	                             2011, 2012, 2015, 2016
Spain	                     To attend Lawyer's Conference          	     2008
United Arab Emirates	     Private Tour	                             2007, 2016
The United Kingdom	     To attend Lawyer's Conference	             2008, 2016

Living people
Punjab MPAs 2013–2018
1964 births
Pakistan Muslim League (N) politicians